Huey Tozoztli  also known as Huey Tocoztli is the name of the fourth month of the Aztec calendar. It is also a festival in the Aztec religion dedicated to Tlaloc and other deities. It is called the great or long vigil.

References

Aztec calendars

Aztec mythology and religion